Philip Williamson may refer to:

 Phil Williamson (born 1965), tennis player from the United States who competed for Antigua and Barbuda in the Davis Cup
 Philip Williamson (historian) (born 1953), British historian